The 2013 Elite One was the 53rd season of the Cameroon Top League.

League table

Owing to an expansion of the 2014 Elite One into 19 teams, no teams were relegated.

References

Cam
Cam
1
Elite One seasons